Shao Bing (邵兵) is a Chinese actor who has won a Huabiao Award.

Filmography

Films

Television

References

External links 
 
 
 
 

1968 births
Living people
Male actors from Zhejiang
Male actors from Hangzhou
Chinese male film actors
Chinese male television actors